is a Japanese actress, voice actress and singer from Sōka, Saitama Prefecture, Japan. She works at Re-Max, although she formerly worked at 81 Produce.

She is best known as the voice of Nagisa Misumi from the original Pretty Cure series, as well as Shizuku Tsukishima from Whisper of the Heart.

She married someone outside of the industry in 2014 and gave birth to a daughter in June 2015. In 2017, she announced her pregnancy with a second child, as well as sharing her experience of miscarriage sometime prior.

Filmography

Anime
Futari wa Pretty Cure (2004) Nagisa Misumi/Cure Black
Agatha Christie no Meitantei Poirot to Marple (2004), Jane Grey – episodes 36-39

Rockman.EXE Stream (2004), Maid D – episode 37
Futari wa Pretty Cure Max Heart (2005), Nagisa Misumi/Cure Black
Emma: A Victorian Romance (2005), Sarah
Glass Mask (2005), Mina Sawatari, Troupe leader – episode 31

Tide-Line Blue (2005), Chenresi
To Heart 2 (2005), Freshman A – episode 3
Cluster Edge (2005), Lina
Oh My Goddess! (2005-01-06), Ere
Ray (2006), Misato
.hack//Roots (2006), Asta
xxxHOLiC (2006), Rin – episode 2
Koi suru Tenshi Angelique: Kokoro no Mezameru Toki (2006), Ange
Koi suru Tenshi Angelique: Kagayaki no Ashita (2007), Ange
Emma: A Victorian Romance Second Act (2007), Annie
Mobile Suit Gundam 00 (2007), Sumeragi Lee Noriega
Noramimi (2008), Merry – episode 11
Mobile Suit Gundam 00 Second Season (2008), Sumeragi Lee Noriega
Hanamaru Kindergarten (2010), Sakura
Highschool of the Dead (2010), Kyoko Hayashi
Karneval (2013), Eva
Happiness Charge PreCure (2014), Nagisa Misumi/Cure Black (ep 1)
Space Patrol Luluco (2016), Lalaco Godspeed
Listeners (2020), Wendy
The Idaten Deities Know Only Peace (2021), Brandy

Original video animation
Gunbuster 2 (2004), Nyan Nok Cham
Sakura Taisen: New York NY. (2007), Yoshino Anri

Film
Only Yesterday (1991), Taeko Okajima (5th grade)
Whisper of the Heart (1995), Shizuku Tsukishima, Theme Song Performance
The Cat Returns (2002), Chika
Futari wa Pretty Cure Max Heart (2005), Nagisa Misumi/Cure Black
Futari wa Precure Max Heart 2: Yukizora no Tomodachi (2005), Nagisa Misumi/Cure Black
Pretty Cure All Stars film series (2009-2016), Nagisa Misumi/Cure Black
Mobile Suit Gundam 00 The Movie: A wakening of the Trailblazer (2010), Sumeragi Lee Noriega
Hugtto! PreCure Futari wa Pretty Cure: All Stars Memories (2018), Nagisa Misumi/Cure Black
My Hero Academia The Movie: World Heroes' Mission (2021), Claire Voyance
Pretty Cure All Stars F (2023), Nagisa Misumi/Cure Black

Drama CD
Karneval (2010), Eva

Video games
Panzer Dragoon Orta (2002), Orta
Fushigi Yūgi: Suzaku Ibun (2008), Soi
Tatsunoko vs. Capcom: Cross Generation of Heroes (2008-12-11, Wii), Saki Omokane
2nd Super Robot Wars Z (2011–2012), Sumeragi Lee Noriega
Super Robot Wars UX (2013), Sumeragi Lee Noriega
Persona 4: Dancing All Night (2015), Tomoe Sayama
Milihime Taisen (2015), Reverberi, Cazzago
Tales of symphonia : Knights of Ratatosk , Aqua

Drama
Shin Ōedo Sōsamō (1984) - episode 25 
MegaBeast Investigator Juspion (1985) - episode 13
The Unfettered Shogun II (1986) - episode 170
You Who Wears the Bride's Costume (1986)
Hidden Relationship (1986)
Kamen Rider Black (1987), Yuki - episode 32
Wakadaisho Tenka Exemption! (1987), Chie – episode 1
Zenigata Heiji (1987), Ochiyo - episode 17
I'm Going to Yoshi! (1987), Momoko
Animal Street Dream Land (1987) - episodes 17 and 25
Fuun Edo Castle Raging General Tokugawa Iemitsu (1987), Aya
1988
Kamen Rider BLACK RX (Episode 9) --Chinese Koizumi
Nanbu Nose Magari ( NHK / Short Drama Series Furusato) --Satoko
Trade ( Toshiba Sunday Theater　1630th)
1989
Dennou Keisatsu Cybercop (Episode 26) --Yukari
Choshichiro Edo Diary 2nd Series Episode 44 "Girl's Cry" (NTV Union Motion Picture) --Shizuka Fujiki
Mistress's street! (TBS / Saturday drama special)
Enthusiastic era special A man who calls a storm (NTV, Wednesday Grand Romance )
1990
Don't touch the thief! (Episode 3) --Kiyo Mita
Special Rescue Police Winspector (Episode 17) --Miki Takaoka
Naked General Wandering Episode 44 "The Bride of Qing and Bengara" (Kansai TV) --Machiko Goto ( Student of Fukiya Elementary School ) [42]
1991
Abare Hasshu Gojo Journey 2nd Series Episode 3 "568 Namida Journey" (TV Tokyo Union Motion Picture)
Choshichiro Edo Diary 3rd Series Episode 11 "Scratch" (NTV Union Motion Picture) --Ochika
Special Rescue Order Solbrain (Episode 2) --Yuka Mizusawa
Representative Director Detective (Episode 38) --Kozue
1993
Hagure Detective Junjou School PART6 (Episode 15) "Frightened Photographs, A Woman Standing in a Classroom at Night" --Asuka Wada
2006
Police Department Investigation Division 1 Section 9 season1 (Episode 8) --Maki

Dubbing

Live-action
Always Shine, Beth (Caitlin FitzGerald))
The Amazing Spider-Man, Gwen Stacy (Emma Stone)
The Amazing Spider-Man 2, Gwen Stacy (Emma Stone)
Battleship, Samantha Shane (Brooklyn Decker)
The Cabin in the Woods, Dana Polk (Kristen Connolly)
The Counselor, Laura (Penélope Cruz)
A Dangerous Man, Tia (Marlaina Mah)
The Dark Crystal (Blu-Ray edition), Kira (Lisa Maxwell)
Dark Shadows, Victoria Winters (Bella Heathcote)
Dear John, Savannah Lynn Curtis (Amanda Seyfried)
Desperate Housewives, Julie Mayer (Andrea Bowen)
Genius, Françoise Gilot (Clémence Poésy)
The Gifted, the Frost Sisters (Skyler Samuels)
Girls of the Sun, Bahar (Golshifteh Farahani)
The Handmaid's Tale, June Osborne (Elisabeth Moss)
The House with a Clock in Its Walls, Mrs. Barnavelt (Lorenza Izzo)
Into the Wild, Carine McCandless (Jena Malone)
The Invisible Man, Cecilia Kass (Elisabeth Moss)
The Kitchen, Claire Walsh (Elisabeth Moss)
My New Sassy Girl, Sassy (Victoria Song)
Pitch Perfect (film series), Aubrey Posen (Anna Camp)
Pretty Little Liars, Alison DiLaurentis (Sasha Pieterse)
The Sapphires, Julie (Jessica Mauboy)
Season of the Witch, Anna (Claire Foy)
Shinjuku Incident, Lily (Fan Bingbing)
The Sisterhood of the Traveling Pants, Bailey Graffman (Jenna Boyd)
The Stand, Frannie Goldsmith (Odessa Young)
Suits, Katrina Bennett (Amanda Schull)
Take Me Home Tonight, Tori Frederking (Teresa Palmer)
Yellowjackets, Shauna (Melanie Lynskey)

Animation
Atomic Betty, Atomic Betty
Love, Death & Robots, Juliet Burton
Wonder Park, June's mother

Discography

Singles

Albums

Mini albums

References

External links
 
Yōko Honna at GamePlaza-Haruka Voice Acting Database 
Yōko Honna at Hitoshi Doi's Seiyuu Database

1979 births
Living people
Japanese child actresses
Japanese women singers
Japanese video game actresses
Japanese voice actresses
Sōka University alumni
Voice actresses from Saitama Prefecture
81 Produce voice actors